Javanese Sri Lankans (Sinhala: ශ්‍රී ලාංකා මැලේ, Ja Minissu) are Sri Lankan people with full or partial ancestry of Javanese descent. They have originated from the island of Java (particularly Central Java), Dutch East Indies (present-day Indonesia). There are approximately 8,500 Javanese Sri Lankan lives in Sri Lanka.

History
The Javanese immigrants came to Sri Lanka when both Sri Lanka and Indonesia were Dutch colonies. These immigrants including convicts and members of noble houses from the Dutch East Indies (present-day Indonesia), who were exiled to Sri Lanka and who never left.

See also
Islam in Sri Lanka
Javanese diaspora
Sri Lankan Malays
Sri Lankan Moors

References

Javanese people
 
S
 
Javanese
Islam in Sri Lanka